The Center for Higher Studies of the Legion of Christ is where most the members of the congregation study their philosophy and theology in preparation for priestly ordination. It is located on the west side of Rome near Via Aurelia, right behind the Pontifical Athenaeum Regina Apostolorum. Most of the religious brothers study at Regina Apostolorum while living at the center (all Legionaries live either at the center or the General house on Via Aurelia while studying philosophy and theology).

History

In 1991, the Legion built a center capable of 300 on via Aurelia Antica. However in 1999 this was turned into a college for diocesan seminarians and the current campus was built.

Events
Often deaconate ordinations and at times priestly ordinations of members of the Legion have been done in the center's chapel.

References

External links
 Legionaries of Christ
 Stages of Formation in the Legion
 Donations for the Center for Higher Studies

Legion of Christ
North
Pontifical universities